Trnov Hrib is a settlement in the hills to the west of Laško in eastern Slovenia. The area is part of the traditional region of Styria. It is now included with the rest of the Municipality of Laško in the Savinja Statistical Region.

Archaeological evidence from the Brdo area points to an Iron Age settlement in the area.

References

External links
Trnov Hrib on Geopedia

Populated places in the Municipality of Laško